Etilson José Martínez Palacio (born 12 May 2000) is a Colombian footballer who currently plays as a midfielder for Real Cartagena.

Career statistics

Club

Notes

References

2000 births
Living people
Colombian footballers
Colombia youth international footballers
Association football midfielders
Bogotá FC footballers
Patriotas Boyacá footballers
Llaneros F.C. players
Real Cartagena footballers
Categoría Primera B players
Footballers from Barranquilla